Siyanda Zwane (born 4 June 1985) is a South African international footballer who plays for Uthongathi, as a right back.

Career
After playing youth football with Maritzburg City, Zwane made his senior debut for Golden Arrows in the 2005-06 season. He spent the 2006-07 season on loan at Nathi Lions. He moved to Mamelodi Sundowns for the 2014–15 season. He signed for Ajax Cape Town ops loan in January 2018.

In 2011 Zwane made his international debut for South Africa.

References

1985 births
Living people
South African soccer players
South Africa international soccer players
Lamontville Golden Arrows F.C. players
Nathi Lions F.C. players
Mamelodi Sundowns F.C. players
Cape Town Spurs F.C. players
Bidvest Wits F.C. players
Uthongathi F.C. players
Association football fullbacks
Sportspeople from Pietermaritzburg